The Botticelli Secret is a 2010  historical-mystery-detective novel written by Marina Fiorato in the vein of code adventures such as The Da Vinci Code by Dan Brown. Set in the 15th century throughout the Italian states, the protagonists are part-time model and full-time prostitute Luciana Vetra and monk Father Guido della Torre as they are thrown together in Florence and chased across the country through the likes of Venice, Milan and Rome. The title of the novel refers to a conspiracy that Luciana has stumbled across, and a code in the famous painting La Primavera by Renaissance artist Sandro Botticelli.

Plot summary
In 15th-century Italy, Luciana Vetra was young and beautiful, with long, golden hair. She was a full-time whore and a part-time model. When her best client asked her to pose as the goddess Flora for a painting, Luciana complied until the artist abruptly sends her away without payment. Luciana angrily took the unfinished painting, but someone was ready to kill her and people she knows to get the painting back.

As friends and clients are murdered around her, Luciana turned to Guido della Torre, a novice at the monastery of Santa Croce. They fled together through the nine great cities of Renaissance Italy, trying to decode the painting's secrets before their enemies caught up with them.

Secret of La Primavera
Woven into the novel like a Dan Brown code, Fiorato analyzes the painting and pulls out each of the characters that Botticelli created—not just to be seen as individuals, but as whole too. Many Renaissance academics (including Professor Guidoni) share the same belief as Fiorato that there is a code in the painting, and its true meaning is revealed at the end of the novel - lifting a conspiracy that would last until the 19th Century.

Marina Fiorato gained special permission from the Uffizi Gallery in Florence to use the image of La Primavera, and many editions published contain the painting's image to help the reader decipher the code.

Reception
 Fiorato creates her own masterpiece set at the height of Medici power. Renaissance Italy comes alive in brilliant sights and sounds from marbled halls to filthy sewers. Luciana is irrepressible, unabashed, and an absolute hoot while Guido foils her nicely as the learned, noble Holmes to her Watson. Political intrigue is deftly woven throughout, allowing readers to try their best sleuthing. — Booklist

Sales
Fiorato's novel has been an international best seller, published across the world.  Work has begun adapting it into an event TV drama with Amber Entertainment, to be shot on location around Italy.

References

External links

 Marina Fiorato's official website
 US Publisher Website
 UK Publisher Website

2010 British novels
Novels set in Venice
Novels set in Milan
Novels set in Florence
Sandro Botticelli
Cultural depictions of 15th-century painters
St. Martin's Press books
John Murray (publishing house) books
Novels set in the 15th century